Darren Jamieson (born 15 February 1991) is a Scottish professional footballer, who plays as a goalkeeper for Kelty Hearts.

Jamieson has previously played for Livingston, Bo'ness United, Hamilton Academical and Arbroath.

Early life
Jamieson grew up in Polbeth, West Lothian and attended West Calder high school. He played in goal from a young age with Murieston United alongside pros like Danny Wilson and Rhys McCabe. Jamieson was then scouted by Rangers where he played for a few years before leaving for Livingston.

Career

Livingston
A product of Livingston's youth system, Jamieson made his debut for the first-team on 27 April 2010, in a 2–0 home win over Albion Rovers in the Scottish Third Division. His next appearance came the following season on 7 May 2011, in a 3–1 away win against Alloa Athletic in the Scottish Second Division. Over the next couple of seasons, he was mainly utilised as reserve keeper in the first-team. He made three consecutive Scottish First Division appearances towards the end of season 2012–13, keeping two clean sheets in those three matches. Jamieson cemented his place as the number 1 goalkeeper at Livingston and in his first season as #1 saved five penalties. He was awarded both supporters young player and play of the year at the end of the season.

After Rangers goalkeeper Liam Kelly signed on loan with Livingston at the beginning of the 2016–17 season, Jamieson was sent on loan to Scottish Junior Football East Region Super League side Bo'ness United.

Hamilton Academical 
Jamieson was released by Livingston on 31 August 2016. Livingston said that he had been released in order to join Premiership club Hamilton Academical, but he was not a Hamilton squad member by 9 September. He finally signed for Hamilton later that month, after a spell with Bo'ness.

Jamieson was one of seven first-team players released by Hamilton at the end of the 2017–18 season,

Arbroath 
Jamieson then signed with League One club Arbroath in May 2018, going on to win promotion to the Championship with the club as 2018–19 League One champions.

Kelty Hearts 
Jamieson signed for Kelty Hearts in July 2020.

Career statistics

Honours
Livingston
Scottish Challenge Cup: 2014–15

Arbroath
Scottish League One: 2018–19

References

External links

1991 births
Living people
Scottish Football League players
Livingston F.C. players
Bo'ness United F.C. players
Association football goalkeepers
Scottish footballers
Sportspeople from Livingston, West Lothian
Footballers from West Lothian
Scottish Professional Football League players
Hamilton Academical F.C. players
Arbroath F.C. players
Kelty Hearts F.C. players